Trooz is a municipality of Wallonia located in the province of Liège, Belgium.

On July 1, 2012, Trooz had 8,432 registered inhabitants, of whom 4,199 were male and 4,233 female. The total area is 24.00 km² which gives a population density of 351 inhabitants per km².

Trooz is situated on the Vesdre River, and is part of the GREOA (Groupement Régional Économique des vallées de l'Ourthe et de l'Amblève) regional grouping for economic purposes.

The municipality consists of the following districts: Forêt, Fraipont, Nessonvaux.

The town centre is the former hamlet of Trooz, in the district of Forêt, which gave its name to the municipality.

Industrial heritage 
The municipality includes several surrounding hamlets including Nessonvaux which is where, between 1904 and 1958, the Imperia company produced automobiles. The factory building survives. This building is one of two examples of test tracks on its roof. The other known roof test track is on the roof of the old Fiat factory in Turin, Italy.

See also
 List of protected heritage sites in Trooz

References

External links
 

Municipalities of Liège Province